Bright Enchil (born 21 March 1996) is a Ghanaian professional footballer who plays as defender for Ghana Premier League side Medeama S.C.

Club career

Early career 
Enchil is a Red Bull Ghana Academy product, where he started his career. He also featured for lower-tier side Joel Bouzou Rangers based in Aburi, Eastern Region of Ghana before moving to Medeama SC in 2018.

Medeama SC 
In February 2018, he signed for Medeama SC. On 28 February 2018, he was unveiled along with 10 other players including Richard Boadu, Ali Ouattara and Ebenezer Ackahbi as the new signings for the Medeama SC ahead of the 2018 Ghana Premier League. He made his debut on 28 March 2018, playing the full 90 minutes in a 1–0 win over Asante Kotoko. He featured in 13 league matches before the league was abandoned due to the dissolution of the Ghana Football Association (GFA) in June 2018, as a result of the Anas Number 12 Expose. During 2019 GFA Normalization Committee Special Competition, he featured in 12 matches to help Medeama place 3rd in group A.

Ahead of the 2019–20 Ghana Premier League, he suffered a knee injury and returned and was named on the match day squad in February 2020 by coach Samuel Boadu, ahead of a match day 7 fixture against Aduana Stars. After his return he played 5 league matches before the season was cancelled due to the COVID-19 pandemic.

On 10 July 2020, Medeama announced that they had reached an agreement with Asante Kotoko to transfer him to the Kumasi-based club and was expected to sign a long-term contract after undergoing a mandatory medical. Along the line the deal fell through and on 15 July 2020, Medeama announced that they had recalled him back to the club after negotiations with Asante Kotoko broke down.

In November 2020, he was later named in the club's list for the upcoming season, 2020–21 Ghana Premier League season. On 4 February 2021, he provided the decisive assist for Justice Blay to score the only goal against Accra Hearts of Oak to grant them a third straight win at home after failing to win first three of the season. He scored his debut professional league goal on 14 February 2021 in a 2–0 win over Bechem United. He was adjudged the man of the match at the end of the match.

International career 
Enchil was called up to the Ghana national under-23 football team in November 2018 by coach Ibrahim Tanko ahead of a two legged 2019 Africa U-23 Cup of Nations first round qualifiers against Togo.

References

External links 
 
 

1996 births
Living people
Association football defenders
Asante Kotoko S.C. players
Aduana Stars F.C. players
Ghana Premier League players
Ghanaian footballers